The Central American Parliament, also known as PARLACEN, is the political institution and parliamentary body of the Central American Integration System (SICA). Its headquarters are in Guatemala City.

History

The PARLACEN origins date back to the Contadora Group, a project of the 1980s that sought to help resolve the civil wars in El Salvador, Guatemala, and Nicaragua. Although the Contadora group was disbanded in 1986, the idea of a greater Central American integration remained, giving rise to the Esquipulas II Agreement, which among other things, created the Central American Parliament. The Treaty establishing the Central American Parliament and other political bodies was signed in 1987; its first formal session was carried out on 28 October 1991 in Guatemala City.

The PARLACEN as a political body in the region is part of the Central American Integration System SICA, established by the Protocol of Tegucigalpa to the Charter of the Organization of American States (ODECA) signed on 13 December 1991. SICA has the fundamental aim to realize an integration that is political and ideological representative in a pluralistic democratic system that guarantees free elections and participation under equal conditions for political parties.

The historic Declaration of Esquipulas I, which was adopted by the presidents of the Central American states in the city of Esquipulas (Guatemala) on 25 May 1986, included the following declaration: "It is necessary to establish and complement activities that support understanding and cooperation with institutional structures. They shall make possible to strengthen the dialogue, the common development, democracy and pluralism as fundamental elements for peace in the region and the integration of Central America. Therefore the foundation of PARLACEN is necessary. Its members are elected freely by universal and direct elections through which the principle of political and participative pluralism is followed."

The agreement of PARLACEN and other political authorities was signed in October 1987 by Guatemala, El Salvador, Costa Rica, Nicaragua, and Honduras. In the beginning, it was an instrument which came into force for only three states (Guatemala, El Salvador and Honduras) on 1 May 1990. PARLACEN was formed on 28 October 1991 and has its head office in Guatemala City, Republic of Guatemala.

Legal status and mission

PARLACEN is the regional assembly of SICA and acts as a permanent political organ to represent opinions and to carry out analyses and discussions about political, economic and cultural affairs of common interest, of basic conditions for democracy, peace, and the integration of Central America, as well to work out initiatives for its realization. It is charged with furthering human rights and international law, to achieve a peaceful coexistence within the framework of security and social welfare, a mission which is well-founded in representative and participative democracy, in pluralism, and in respect for national legislation and international law.

PARLACEN has the status of a legal entity according to international law.

Member states 

The following countries comprise the PARLACEN:
 
 
 
 
 
 

Between 1998 and 2010, the Dominican Republic sent 22 appointed members. Since 2010, it has been a full member of the Central American Parliament with delegates elected directly by universal suffrage. (See note)

Panama
President of Panama Ricardo Martinelli vowed he would remove Panama from PARLACEN, fulfilling a campaign promise. On 11 December 2009, law 78 passed withdrawing Panama from PARLACEN, but a resolution of the Central American Court of Justice declared the law unconstitutional. The court said there is no mechanism to withdraw from the PARLACEN and Panama could not opt out. In January 2012, the Panamanian Supreme Court re-affirmed that ruling and Panama returned to PARLACEN. Panama also showed more interest in membership after SICA signed a free trade agreement with the European Union.

Observer status

Competences and tasks
The PARLACEN is the regional and permanent organ of political and democratic representation of the System of Central American Integration (SICA) with the main purpose to realize the Central American integration.

Competencies
 Proposal of legislation concerning the integration.
 Democratic control of the integration.
 Initiatives to deepen and amplify the integration.

Tasks
 Promoting the process of integration and leading the way to the greatest possible cooperation between the Central American states.
 Proposing draft treaties and agreements which are to be negotiated by the Central American states and forming an opinion of what the SICA proposes.
 Creating special commissions to determine the discordances between the states that could affect the integration.
 Helping to consolidate a democratic, pluralistic, and participative form of government in the Central American states.
 Promoting the validity of international law.
 Knowing the official executive authorities of SICA.
 Knowing the budgets of the institutions of SICA.

Bodies of PARLACEN
PARLACEN's organisational structure consists of the Plenum, the Board of Parliament, and the Secretary Office.

Plenum
The Plenum is the highest body of PARLACEN and includes all representatives.
The committees and parliamentary parties are also involved with its tasks.

The responsibilities of the Plenum are the following:
 Advice to the presidents' assembly concerning affairs of peace, security of Central America, and development of the region.
 Annual election of the board of parliament.
 Approval of the budget of PARLACEN.
 Assessment and decision concerning the reports of the board of parliament.
 Composition and approval of internal decrees of PARLACEN and other necessary regulations.
 Formation of working commissions.
 Proposal of drafts of contracts and agreements that are to be negotiated between the states of Central America.
 Annual discharge of the boards of the parliamentary standing committees.
 Other tasks which are assigned to it by its constitutive contract or its additional instruments.

The parliamentary committees
The parliamentary committees are parliamentary authorities who – in order to draw up a corresponding report – are supposed to conduct studies and examinations which are either within their sphere of competence or are directed to them by the board or the Plenum.

The working committees of PARLACEN can be structured as follows.

Permanent commissions are established in the internal rules to work on affairs of the commission with unlimited duration. The permanent commissions are formed of at most two representatives per state, not exceeding twelve members in total.

, there were thirteen permanent commissions:
 Commission of Agriculture, Fishing, Environment and Natural Resources
 Commission of Urban Development, Public Participation
 Commission of Education, Culture, Sports, Science and Technology
 Commission of Women, Children, Youth and Family
 Commission of Macroeconomics and Finance
 Commission of Tourism
 Commission of International Relations and Migration Affairs
 Commission of Health, Social Security, Population, Labour and Corporation Affairs
 Commission of Peace, Public Security and Human Rights
 Commission of Integration, Trade and Economic Development
 Commission of Legal Affairs and Regional Institutions
 Commission of Politics and Party Affairs
 Commission of Indigenous Peoples and Afro Descendants

There is also a delegation of EUROLAT.

Extraordinary commissions are established by the Plenum for affairs that are of special importance and institutional significance for PARLACEN as well as for the process of integration. But can also help you when you need the most help like right now.

Special commissions are established by the board of parliament to handle special affairs.

Parliamentary groups
The parliamentary groups monitor the political trend of the Central American representatives and are organized according to the political orientation of their groups.

The parliamentary groups are founded by the adoption of an internal statute by the plenary assembly. The board of parliament registers each parliamentary group. The statute is published and states the group's ideological principles, the political objectives and the regulations.

There are three parliamentary groups: the Parliamentary Group of the Left, Center-Democratic Integration Group, and Democratic Integrationist Union.

Board of parliament

The board of parliament is the executive body for decisions that emerge from the Plenum and is the administrative body of PARLACEN. It is expandable according to its internal rules.

The board of parliament is elected from the members. Its term is one year, made up of one president, five vice-presidents, and six secretaries.

The board makes its decisions by approval of a majority of its members. In the event of a tie, the votes of the presidency count as qualified majority. The presidency is filled by a rota system corresponding to the alphabetical order of the member states, starting with the state which holds the head office.

It is possible to appeal any resolution at the Plenum.

The tasks of the board are
 Consideration and handling of all requests for which PARLACEN is in charge.
 Conveying of the invitations for the ordinary and extraordinary meetings of the Plenum of PARLACEN.
 Draft of the budget – designated in Central American Pesos – for the routine work of PARLACEN.
 Realizing the resolutions of PARLACEN.
 Handing in the annual report about the execution of its duties and the result of its administration to the plenary as well as the report about the budget.
 Management and control of the secretary office and appointment of necessary personnel. Here, the equal treatment of all Central American states has to be taken into consideration.
 Handling of the economic and organizational affairs which affect PARLACEN.
 Proposal to the Plenum of regulating instruments which are required by the internal order.
 Creation of special commissions to carry out a task or realize a special function.
 Proper filling in of vacancies that occur in absence of a representative.
 Calling of the deputy representative in case of vacancies.
 Proposal of a suitable list of candidates for the appointment of the internal and external accountants of PARLACEN to the plenary.
 Formation of delegations for official missions. This has to be done in accordance to the regulating norms for the integration of special missions of PARLACEN.
 Establishing its own internal rules
 Dividing tasks among its members.
 Other tasks which are assigned to the board by the constitutive contract or by additional instruments.

Secretary office
The secretary office is the technical-administrative organ of PARLACEN and is divided into three sections, which have the following basic functions and responsibilities:

The secretary office for parliamentary affairs handles and obeys the decisions of PARLACEN. It reports to the Plenum on a regular basis and is of technical assistance to the Plenum as well as to the commissions in all of their activities. It coordinates and manages the advice of the commissions and has to assist the extended board with developing the agenda for Plenum meetings when necessary.

The secretary office for administration and finance has to administer all branches, manager's offices, departments and administrative units, as well as the personnel of PARLACEN, and has to control the proper administration of its resources.

The secretary office of the board offers technical help to the board in questions relating to the responsibilities of and the topics determined by the board.

Presidents of PARLACEN

Elections 
The 20 elected members representing every member state the Central American Parliament are elected at the same time as the presidential elections of the member state according to article 2 of the Internal Regulations of the Central American Parliament. The former president of every member state, as well as every vice-president and prime minister, are also de jure members of the PARLACEN from the end of their term till the end of their successor's term.
 24 November 2013: Honduras
 4 May 2014: Panama
 1 March 2015: El Salvador
 6 September 2015: Guatemala
 15 May 2016: Dominican Republic
 6 November 2016: Nicaragua

2007 parliament members killing

On February 19 2007, a group of three Salvadoran representatives were murdered by four Guatemalan police officers, including the head of the Guatemalan National Police organized crime unit. The killers were arrested three days later and detained in a Guatemalan prison, where they were themselves murdered several days later by a group of gunmen disguised as prison guards. Guatemalan president Oscar Berger attributed the officers’ murders to an apparent mafia hit aimed at hindering investigation into the representatives’ murders. The killings raised questions regarding corruption and drug trafficking in Central America as well as the high level of infiltration of the Guatemalan national police force by organized crime.

See also 
 Andean Parliament
 Latin American Parliament (Parlatino);
 Mercosur Parliament.

References

External links 
 Central American Parliament

 El exvicepresidente guatemalteco Alfonso Fuentes Soria es nuevo presidente del Parlacen
 :es:Alfonso Fuentes Soria
 Ex vicepresidente Alfonso Fuentes Soria es nuevo presidente del Parlacen
 Exvicepresidente de Guatemala es el nuevo presidente del Parlacen
 Parlamento Centroamericano | Sitio oficial
 
 :es:Parlamento Centroamericano
 Parlamento Centroamericano | Sitio oficial
 Nadia de León Torres se queda con la presidencia del Parlacen
Ortega's deputy, Daniel Ortega Reyes, was elected President of Barlaçin
Parlamento Centroamericano | Sitio oficial
Parlamento Centroamericano | Sitio oficial
Parlamento Centroamericano | Sitio oficial

Politics of Central America
Parliamentary assemblies
Supranational legislatures
1991 establishments in North America
International organizations based in the Americas